Megachile erythrura is a species of bee in the family Megachilidae. It was described by Pasteels in 1970.

References

Erythrura
Insects described in 1970